Gunma is the name of several places in Japan:

In Gunma prefecture:

 Gunma Town in Gunma District
 Kisaragi Gunma (如月 群真), hentai manga artist